Hold My Beer may refer to:

 Hold My Beer Vol. 1, a 2015 album by Randy Rogers and Wade Bowen
 "Hold My Beer", a song on Trace Adkins' 2010 album Cowboy's Back in Town
 "Hold My Beer", a song on Aaron Pritchett's 2006 album Big Wheel
 "Hold My Beer", an unreleased song by Beyoncé